Thomas Francis Smyth (1875–1937) was an Irish nationalist politician and Member of Parliament (MP) in the House of Commons of the United Kingdom of Great Britain and Ireland.

He was first elected unopposed as the Irish Parliamentary Party MP for the Leitrim South constituency at the 1906 general election, and was again re-elected at the January 1910 and December 1910 general elections.

External links

 

1875 births
1937 deaths
Irish Parliamentary Party MPs
Members of the Parliament of the United Kingdom for County Leitrim constituencies (1801–1922)
UK MPs 1906–1910
UK MPs 1910
UK MPs 1910–1918
People from County Leitrim